The London District was a historic district in Upper Canada. It was formed in 1798 from parts of the Home and Western Districts, and lasted until its abolition in 1850.

Historic evolution
The District was formed by an Act of the Parliament of Upper Canada in 1798, and was described as consisting of

The townships and counties were thus organized:

The district town was Charlotteville (later named Turkey Point), but moved to Tisdale's Mills (later named Vittoria) in 1815. In 1826, the district town was moved to London, and the townships of Rainham and Walpole were moved to Haldimand County in Niagara District because of their distance from London.

The Huron Tract, being developed at the time by the Canada Company, was divided between the London and Western Districts in 1835, with the greater part of the territory in the London District forming the new Huron County. That County was later withdrawn in October 1841 to form the new Huron District.

In 1837, Oxford County was separated into the new Brock District, and Norfolk County was separated to form Talbot District.

In 1840, the following lands were withdrawn from London District and attached to Waterloo County in Wellington District:

 reserved lands west of Woolwich and Nichol
 the triangular piece of land adjoining the said tract in the proposed District of Huron
 part of the late purchase from the Indians of Gore, and part of Indian lands

In 1845, the District was restricted in area to cover Middlesex County only. thus detaching the remainder of its northern part extending to Lake Huron. This was rectified by the territory's attachment to Huron District in 1846.

At the beginning of 1850, the district was abolished, being replaced by the United Counties of Middlesex and Elgin and in 1850 as standalone Middlesex County for municipal purposes.

Further reading
 Armstrong, Frederick H. Handbook of Upper Canadian Chronology. Toronto : Dundurn Press, 1985.

References

Districts of Upper Canada
1798 establishments in Upper Canada
1849 disestablishments in Canada